The sultans of the Ottoman Empire, who were all members of the Ottoman dynasty (House of Osman), ruled over the transcontinental empire from its perceived inception in 1299 to its dissolution in 1922. At its height, the Ottoman Empire spanned an area from Hungary in the north to Yemen in the south and from Algeria in the west to Iraq in the east. Administered at first from the city of Söğüt since before 1280 and then from the city of Bursa since 1323 or 1324, the empire's capital was moved to Adrianople (now known as Edirne in English) in 1363 following its conquest by Murad I and then to Constantinople (present-day Istanbul) in 1453 following its conquest by Mehmed II.

The Ottoman Empire's early years have been the subject of varying narratives, due to the difficulty of discerning fact from legend. The empire came into existence at the end of the 13th century, and its first ruler (and the namesake of the Empire) was Osman I. According to later, often unreliable Ottoman tradition, Osman was a descendant of the Kayı tribe of the Oghuz Turks. The eponymous Ottoman dynasty he founded endured for six centuries through the reigns of 36 sultans. The Ottoman Empire disappeared as a result of the defeat of the Central Powers, with whom it had allied itself during World War I. The partitioning of the Empire by the victorious Allies and the ensuing Turkish War of Independence led to the abolition of the sultanate in 1922 and the birth of the modern Republic of Turkey in 1922.

Names
The sultan was also referred to as the Padishah. In Ottoman usage the word "Padisha" was usually used except "sultan" was used when he was directly named. In several European languages, he was referred to as the Grand Turk, as the ruler of the Turks, or simply the "Great Lord" (il Gran Signore, le grand seigneur) especially in the 16th century.

Names of the sultan in languages used by ethnic minorities:
 Arabic: In some documents "Padishah" was replaced by "malik" ("king")
 Bulgarian:  In earlier periods Bulgarian people called him the "tsar". The translation of the Ottoman Constitution of 1876 instead used direct translations of "sultan" (Sultan) and "padishah" (Padišax)
 Greek: In earlier periods the Greeks used the Byzantine Empire-style name "basileus". The translation of the Ottoman Constitution of 1876 instead used a direct transliterations of "sultan" (Σουλτάνος Soultanos) and "padishah" (ΠΑΔΙΣΑΧ padisach).
 Judaeo-Spanish: Especially in older documents, El Rey ("the king") was used. In addition some Ladino documents used sultan (in Hebrew characters: שולטן and סולטן).

State organisation of the Ottoman Empire 

The Ottoman Empire was an absolute monarchy during much of its existence. By the second half of the fifteenth century, the sultan sat at the apex of a hierarchical system and acted in political, military, judicial, social, and religious capacities under a variety of titles. He was theoretically responsible only to God and God's law (the Islamic  şeriat, known in Arabic as  sharia), of which he was the chief executor. His heavenly mandate (Kut) was reflected in Islamic titles such as "shadow of God on Earth" ( ẓıll Allāh fī'l-ʿalem) and "caliph of the face of the earth" ( Ḫalife-i rū-yi zemīn). All offices were filled by his authority, and every law was issued by him in the form of a decree called firman. He was the supreme military commander and had the official title to all land. Osman (died 1323–4) son of Ertuğrul was the first ruler of the Ottoman state, which during his reign constituted a small principality (beylik) in the region of Bithynia on the frontier of the Byzantine Empire.

After the conquest of Constantinople in 1453 by Mehmed II, Ottoman sultans came to regard themselves as the successors of the Roman Empire, hence their occasional use of the titles caesar ( qayser) of Rûm, and emperor, as well as the caliph of Islam. Newly enthroned Ottoman rulers were girded with the Sword of Osman, an important ceremony that served as the equivalent of European monarchs' coronation. A non-girded sultan was not eligible to have his children included in the line of succession.

Although absolute in theory and in principle, the sultan's powers were limited in practice. Political decisions had to take into account the opinions and attitudes of important members of the dynasty, the bureaucratic and military establishments, as well as religious leaders. Beginning in the last decades of the sixteenth century, the role of the Ottoman sultans in the government of the empire began to decrease, in a period known as the Transformation of the Ottoman Empire. Despite being barred from inheriting the throne, women of the imperial harem—especially the reigning sultan's mother, known as the valide sultan—also played an important behind-the-scenes political role, effectively ruling the empire during the period known as the Sultanate of Women.

Constitutionalism was established during the reign Abdul Hamid II, who thus became the empire's last absolute ruler and its reluctant first constitutional monarch. Although Abdul Hamid II abolished the parliament and the constitution to return to personal rule in 1878, he was again forced in 1908 to reinstall constitutionalism and was deposed. Since 2021, the head of the House of Osman has been Harun Osman, a great-grandson of Abdul Hamid II.

List of sultans

The table below lists Ottoman sultans, as well as the last Ottoman caliph, in chronological order. The tughras were the calligraphic seals or signatures used by Ottoman sultans. They were displayed on all official documents as well as on coins, and were far more important in identifying a sultan than his portrait. The "Notes" column contains information on each sultan's parentage and fate. Early Ottomans practiced what historian Quataert has described as "survival of the fittest, not eldest, son": when a sultan died, his sons had to fight each other for the throne until a victor emerged. Because of the infighting and numerous fratricides that occurred, there was often a time gap between a sultan's death date and the accession date of his successor. In 1617, the law of succession changed from survival of the fittest to a system based on agnatic seniority ( ekberiyet), whereby the throne went to the oldest male of the family. This in turn explains why from the 17th century onwards a deceased sultan was rarely succeeded by his own son, but usually by an uncle or brother. Agnatic seniority was retained until the abolition of the sultanate, despite unsuccessful attempts in the 19th century to replace it with primogeniture. Note that pretenders and co-claimants during the Ottoman Interregnum are also listed here, but they are not included in the formal numbering of sultans.

See also

Line of succession to the Ottoman throne
Ottoman Sultan family tree
Ottoman family tree (more detailed)
List of valide sultans
List of Ottoman Grand Viziers
List of admirals in the Ottoman Empire
List of Ottoman Kaptan Pashas

Notes

a: The full style of the Ottoman ruler was complex, as it was composed of several titles and evolved over the centuries. The title of sultan was used continuously by all rulers almost from the beginning. However, because it was widespread in the Muslim world, the Ottomans quickly adopted variations of it to dissociate themselves from other Muslim rulers of lesser status. Murad I, the third Ottoman monarch, styled himself sultân-ı âzam (the most exalted sultan) and hüdavendigar (emperor), titles used by the Anatolian Seljuqs and the Mongol Ilkhanids respectively. His son Bayezid I adopted the style Sultan of Rûm, Rûm being an old Islamic name for the Roman Empire. The combining of the Islamic and Central Asian heritages of the Ottomans led to the adoption of the title that became the standard designation of the Ottoman ruler: Sultan [Name] Khan. Ironically, although the title of sultan is most often associated in the Western world with the Ottomans, people within Turkey generally use the title of padishah far more frequently when referring to rulers of the Ottoman Dynasty.
b: The Ottoman Caliphate symbolized their spiritual power, whereas the sultanate represented their temporal power. According to Ottoman historiography, Murad I adopted the title of caliph during his reign (1362 to 1389), and Selim I later strengthened the caliphal authority during his conquest of Egypt in 1516-1517. However, the general consensus among modern scholars is that Ottoman rulers had used the title of caliph before the conquest of Egypt, as early as during the reign of Murad I (1362–1389), who brought most of the Balkans under Ottoman rule and established the title of sultan in 1383. It is currently agreed that the caliphate "disappeared" for two-and-a-half centuries, before being revived with the Treaty of Küçük Kaynarca, signed between the Ottoman Empire and Catherine II of Russia in 1774. The treaty was highly symbolic, since it marked the first international recognition of the Ottomans' claim to the caliphate. Although the treaty made official the Ottoman Empire's loss of the Crimean Khanate, it acknowledged the Ottoman caliph's continuing religious authority over Muslims in Russia. From the 18th century onwards, Ottoman sultans increasingly emphasized their status as caliphs in order to stir Pan-Islamist sentiments among the empire's Muslims in the face of encroaching European imperialism. When World War I broke out, the sultan/caliph issued a call for jihad in 1914 against the Ottoman Empire's Allied enemies, unsuccessfully attempting to incite the subjects of the French, British and Russian empires to revolt. Abdul Hamid II was by far the Ottoman Sultan who made the most use of his caliphal position, and was recognized as Caliph by many Muslim heads of state, even as far away as Sumatra. He had his claim to the title inserted into the 1876 Constitution (Article 4).
c: Tughras were used by 35 out of 36 Ottoman sultans, starting with Orhan in the 14th century, whose tughra has been found on two different documents. No tughra bearing the name of Osman I, the founder of the empire, has ever been discovered, although a coin with the inscription "Osman bin Ertuğrul" has been identified. Abdulmejid II, the last Ottoman Caliph, also lacked a tughra of his own, since he did not serve as head of state (that position being held by Mustafa Kemal, President of the newly founded Republic of Turkey) but as a religious and royal figurehead.
d: The Ottoman Interregnum, also known as the Ottoman Triumvirate, was a period of chaos in the Ottoman Empire which lasted from 1402 to 1413. It started following the defeat and capture of Bayezid I by the Turco-Mongol warlord Tamerlane at the Battle of Ankara, which was fought on 20 July 1402. Bayezid's sons fought each other for over a decade, until Mehmed I emerged as the undisputed victor in 1413.
e: The dissolution of the Ottoman Empire was a gradual process which started with the abolition of the sultanate and ended with that of the caliphate 16 months later. The sultanate was formally abolished on 1 November 1922. Sultan Mehmed VI fled to Malta on 17 November aboard the British warship Malaya. This event marked the end of the Ottoman Dynasty, not of the Ottoman State nor of the Ottoman Caliphate. On 18 November, the Grand National Assembly (TBMM) elected Mehmed VI's cousin Abdulmejid II, the then crown prince, as caliph. The official end of the Ottoman State was declared through the Treaty of Lausanne (24 July 1923), which recognized the new "Ankara government," and not the old Istanbul-based Ottoman government, as representing the rightful owner and successor state. The Republic of Turkey was proclaimed by the TBMM on 29 October 1923, with Mustafa Kemal as its first President. Although Abdulmejid II was a figurehead lacking any political power, he remained in his position of Caliph until the office of the Caliphate was abolished by the TBMM on 3 March 1924. Mehmed VI later tried unsuccessfully to reinstall himself as caliph in the Hejaz.

References

Bibliography

 

} (info page on book at Martin Luther University) // CITED: p. 43-44 (PDF p. 45-46/338).

 
Ottoman Sultans
Ottoman Sultans
Heads of state of Turkey
Lists of Asian rulers
Lists of European rulers